Desires of the Heart is a 2013 English independent film directed by James Kicklighter and co-directed in India with Rajesh Rathi. It stars Hollywood actors Val Lauren, Alicia Minshew alongside Bollywood actors Harsh Mayar, Gulshan Grover and Ankit Bhardwaj. The film began production in 2012 in Savannah, Georgia, United States. and was later shot in Bikaner, Rajasthan, India.

Plot
Dr. Kris Sharma (Val Lauren) is a psychiatrist from India practicing in Savannah, Georgia when he meets Madeline (Alicia Minshew), a local artist with a mysterious past. While their relationship begins to blossom in America, Kris is summoned home by his brother (Gulshan Grover) to marry the woman (Priya Ahuja) chosen by his parents. But as he begins to make decisions about his future, he discovers centuries old secrets that may seal the fate of his destiny.

Cast
 Val Lauren as Dr. Krishh
 Alicia Minshew as Madeline
 Harsh Mayar as Nanu
 Gulshan Grover as Pradeep
 Priya Ahuja as Lena
 Ankit Bhardwaj as Gopal
 Archana Gupta as Radha

Release
Desires of the Heart premiered during the 2014 Cannes Film Festival on 17 May 2014 in the Marche' du Films. and was released in theaters across India on November 6, 2015 by Luminosity Pictures

Critical reception
Indyred.com gave the film 4.5 stars out of 5 and wrote, "Desires Of The Heart is a damn near perfect Indie production in my eyes. All the pieces are there, and puzzled together in an expert way". Film Threat gave 3.5 stars and wrote, "Sometimes Desires of the Heart feels like one of those films where its narrative ambition gets the better of it, but there are indeed moments of mastery to be found throughout. It’s a strong film, and I’d rather have a film take risks and not quite always work for me than simply play it safe and mediocre". Independent Critic gave it 2.5 stars out of 4 and wrote, "Desires of the Heart is a beautiful and involving film featuring two fine performances by its leads".

Awards and nominations

Wins
 Best Foreign Film, LA Femme International Film Festival, California, 2013

Nominations
 Best Screenplay (Solila Parida), Hoboken International Film Festival, NY, 2014
 Best Supporting Actress (Alicia Minshew), Hoboken International Film Festival, NY, 2014

Official Selection
 Central Florida Film Festival, 2014
 Hoboken International Film Festival, 2014
 Sedona International Film Festival, 2014
 Macon Film Festival, 2014
 LA Femme International Film Festival, 2013

References

External links
 
 Flair Communications
 DOTH Entertainment
 http://JamesKicklighter.com

2013 films
Films set in Rajasthan
2013 directorial debut films
2010s English-language films